Macalester College is a private liberal arts college in Saint Paul, Minnesota, US.

Macalester may also refer to:

Mount Macalester, peak in Antarctica

People with the surname Macalester
Charles Macalester (1798–1873), American businessman and philanthropist
Charles Somerville MacAlester (1797–1891), chief of Clan MacAlister

See also
McAlester (disambiguation)
McAlister (disambiguation)